êmîcêtôsêt-Many Bloodlines is a Canadian documentary film, directed by Theola Ross and released in 2020. The film documents the experience of Ross, a queer-identified Cree woman, and her partner as they pursue in vitro fertilisation treatment after deciding to raise a child together.

The film premiered at the 2020 Hot Docs Canadian International Documentary Festival, where it was named the winner of the Betty Youson Award for Best Canadian Short Documentary. It subsequently won the award for Best Short Documentary Work at the 2020 imagineNATIVE Film and Media Arts Festival.

The film was named to the Toronto International Film Festival's year-end Canada's Top Ten list for short films. The film received a Canadian Screen Award nomination for Best Short Documentary at the 9th Canadian Screen Awards in 2021.

References

External links

2020 films
2020 short documentary films
2020 LGBT-related films
Canadian short documentary films
Documentary films about First Nations
Documentary films about lesbians
Films shot in Winnipeg
Canadian LGBT-related short films
LGBT First Nations culture
2020s English-language films
2020s Canadian films